Alice Elizabeth Burton or Aitken (born 1908) was a British-Canadian novelist and popular historian.

Life
Born in Cairo to Richard Burton and Alice Gwendolyn (née Kerby, later Duck), she grew up in Windsor, Ontario. She later studied privately in Rome. In 1935 Burton married John Theodore Aitken at Windsor, Ontario. In the 1940s she wrote comic fantasy novels under the pseudonym Susan Alice Kerby. In Miss Carter and the Ifrit (1945), a Muslim spirit helped a spinster to find love during the Second World War. In Mr Kronion (1949), a Greek god defended English village life.

From 1945 to 1965, she was the London correspondent of a Canadian daily, the Windsor Star.
Changing her surname by deed poll from Aitken to Burton in 1950, she published her historical writing as Elizabeth Burton.

Works

Novels
As Alice Elizabeth Burton
 Cling to her, waiting. London: A. Dakers, 1939.

As Susan Alice Kerby
 Fortnight in Frascati. London: A. Dakers, 1940.
 Miss Carter and the Ifrit. London: Hutchinson, 1945.
 Many Strange Birds. London: Hutchinson, 1947. Published in the US as Fortune's Gift. New York: Dodd, Mead & Co., 1947. 
 Gone to Grass: a novel. London: Hutchinson, 1948. Published in the US as The Roaring Dove. New York: Dodd, Mead & Co., 1948.
 Mr Kronion: a novel. London: Werner Laurie, 1949.

Historical writing
 The Elizabethans at Home. Secker & Warburg, 1958. Illustrated by Felix Kelly. Published in the US as The Pageant of Elizabethan England, Scribner, 1959.
 The Jacobeans at Home Secker & Warburg, 1962. Illustrated by Felix Kelly. Published in the US as The Pageant of Stuart England, Scribner, 1962.
 Here is England. New York: Ariel Books, 1965.
 The Georgians at Home, 1714-1830. London: Longmans, 1967. Illustrated by Felix Kelly. Published in the US as The Pageant of Georgian England, Scribner, 1967.
 The Early Victorians at Home, 1972. Illustrated by Felix Kelly. Published in the US as The Pageant of Early Victorian England, Scribner, 1972.
 The Early Tudors at Home, 1485-1558, 1976. Illustrated by Felix Kelly. Published in the US as The Pageant of Early Tudor England, Scribner, 1976.

References

External links 

  as Elizabeth Burton and Susan Kerby
 

1908 births
Year of death missing
British women historians
British women novelists
British women journalists
Writers from Cairo
20th-century British historians
20th-century British novelists
20th-century British women writers
British expatriates in Egypt
British emigrants to Canada
Canadian expatriates in Italy